The powerful goshawk (Accipiter efficax), also referred to as the greater New Caledonian goshawk, is an extinct species of bird of prey in the family Accipitridae.  It was endemic to the island of New Caledonia in Melanesia in the southwest Pacific region.  It was described from subfossil bones found at the Pindai Caves paleontological site on the west coast of Grande Terre.  The Latin specific epithet efficax means "powerful".

References

Accipiter
Extinct birds of New Caledonia
Holocene extinctions
Birds described in 1989
Taxa named by Jean-Christophe Balouet
Late Quaternary prehistoric birds